New Caledonia competed at the 2019 Pacific Games in Apia, Samoa from 7 to 20 July 2019. The country selected 327 athletes to participate in 22 sports at the 2019 games.

Archery

Athletics

Badminton

New Caledonia qualified eight players in badminton for the 2019 games.

Men
 Ronan Ho-Yagues
 Bryan Nicole
 Morgan Paitio

Women
 Soizick Ho-Yagues
 Johanna Kou
 Dgenyva Matauli
 Cecilia Moussy
 Melissa Sanmoestanom

Basketball

5x5

Men's basketball
 TBC

Women's basketball
 TBC

3x3

Men
 TBC

Women
 TBC

Boxing

Cricket

Football

Men's football

Squad
TBC

Women's football

Squad
TBC

Golf

New Caledonia qualified eight players for the 2019 tournament:

Men
 Morgan Dufour
 Adrien Peres
 Guillaume Castagne
 Dylan Benoit

Women
 Ariane Klotz
 Emilie Ricaud
 Mathilde Guepy
 Ines Lavelua-Tufele

Judo

Outrigger canoeing

Powerlifting

Rugby sevens

Men's sevens

Women's sevens

Sailing

Shooting

Squash

Swimming

Table tennis

Taekwondo

Tennis

Triathlon

Volleyball

Beach volleyball

New Caledonia selected 4 athletes to compete in beach volleyball, a men's pair and a women's pair.

Men
 Euphraim Iwane
 Rudy Issamatro

Women
 Julia Qazing
 Evelyne Lawi

Volleyball (Indoor)

Teams of 14 players each were selected for men's and women's indoor volleyball.

Men
 Jordan Boula
 Jonathan Goulou
 Ludovik Iloai
 Vitolio Iloai
 Morten Kahlemue
 Rodrigue Manuahalalo
 Quincy Manuopuava
 Petelo Motuku
 Jimmy Ngaiohny Jr
 Maoni Talia
 Romain Totele
 Freddy Wea
 Jacques Wainebengo
 Christopher Suve

Women
 Ramana Ariioehau
 Sabine Haewegene
 Moone Konhu
 Aurélie Konhu
 Coralie Maccam
 Liwenda Manuohalalo
 Sarah Nehoune
 Andréa Puakavase
 Déborah Rokuad
 Luawé Tangopi
 Beverley Vaoheilala
 Alexia Wanabo
 Evangélia Wanabo
 Hmadren Wenehoua

Weightlifting

References

Nations at the 2019 Pacific Games
2019